was a Japanese football player. He played for Japan national team.

Club career
Inoue was born in Nishinomiya on September 30, 1928. After graduating from Kwansei Gakuin University, he played for New Mitsubishi Heavy Industries from 1952 to 1960. He also played for Kwangaku Club was consisted of his alma mater Kwansei Gakuin University players and graduates. At the club, he won 1955 Emperor's Cup.

National team career
In March 1954, Inoue was selected Japan national team for 1954 World Cup qualification. At this qualification, on March 7, he debuted against South Korea.

Inoue died on April 5, 1992 at the age of 63.

National team statistics

References

External links
 
 Japan National Football Team Database

1928 births
1992 deaths
Kwansei Gakuin University alumni
Association football people from Hyōgo Prefecture
Japanese footballers
Japan international footballers
Urawa Red Diamonds players
Association football midfielders